Juwe Kazimbe Joyeux (born November 26, 1995), better known as Joyeux Bin Kabodjo, is a Congolese ⁣⁣humorist⁣⁣, comedian, storyteller, poet and jurist.

Biography 
Joyeux Bin Kabodjo was born November 26, 1995, in Bukavu, capital of South Kivu Province in eastern Democratic Republic of Congo. Son of Juwe Kabodjo and Nzigire Kazimbe, he familiarized himself with the world of comedy through French comedians on television and in the theater. At the age of seventeen, he began his artistic career as an animator and sometimes a participant in cultural events in his native town.

In 2014, Joyeux Bin Kabodjo produced his very first show, "La Scène du Paradis Mordu". After that, in 2017 he created "Bukavu Comedy Club", a comedy residency aimed at propelling the new generation of comedians, and launched the very first humor festival in Bukavu, entitled "Zéro Polémik".

From 2017, Joyeux Bin Kabodjo began numerous appearances on the international scene: he was invited to the first edition of Kigingi Summer Comedy in Burundi in July and to the Festival of Nuit des Plaisanteries in Ouagadougou, Burkina Faso, in November 2017. He represents, with Alain Esongo, the Democratic Republic of the Congo in the twelfth season of Le Parlement du rire in Abidjan, Ivory Coast, and participates in the fifth edition of the Africa Stand Up Festival, which was held from October 25 to November 2, 2021, in Douala, Cameroon.

Director of Bukavu Comedy Club since 2017, humorist Joyeux Bin Kabodjo has been appointed as the new ambassador in Bukavu of Africa Stand Up, an association which works for the development of the "stand-up" sector in Africa, by ensuring the detection, training and the accompaniment of young African comedians. He signs a partnership with the Pan-African Stand Up Academy which will allow two local comedians, a man and a woman, each year since 2022, to go to Cameroon to follow training workshops and participate in the Africa Stand Up Festival supported by Canal+ Afrique.

Filmography

YouTube series

Shows

Awards 

|-
|2021
|Himself
|IRD Great Lakes
|
|-
|2022
|Himself
|African Laughter Awards (ARA)
|
|-

Participations 

 2017: Kigingi Summer Comedy
 2017: Festival Nuit des Plaisanteries
 2018: Zéro Polémik Festival
 2021: Africa Stand Up Festival
 2021: Le Parlement du rire in Ivory Coast

References

External links 

 Joyeux Bin Kabodjo on Twitter

1995 births
Congolese comedians
Living people
People from Bukavu
Congolese humorists
People from South Kivu
21st-century Democratic Republic of the Congo people
Humorists
French humorists
Democratic Republic of the Congo male actors